Four Sisters (lit. "The Story of Four Sisters") is a 2001 South Korean television series starring Hwang Soo-jung, Chae Rim, Ahn Yeon-hong, Park Ye-jin, Han Jae-suk, Kim Chan-woo, Ji Jin-hee, Park Chul and Nam Sung-jin. It aired on MBC from June 13 to August 16, 2001, on Wednesdays and Thursdays at 21:55 for 20 episodes.

Plot
Jung Hae-jung is the eldest of four sisters, and is kind and giving to her younger sisters - even though she's actually their half-sister. In contrast, second sister Yu-jin is ambitious and straightforward, and cares deeply for family friend Young-hoon. Third sister Yu-mi is materialistic, and gets engaged to a rich man, despite being more compatible with her ex-boyfriend Tae-suk. And fourth sister Yoo-sun is a high school student with heart problems and has a crush on her teacher. Each sister struggles to find true love, and conflicts and difficulties arise. But through it all, they remain true to each other.

Cast
Main characters
Hwang Soo-jung as Jung Hae-jung (oldest sister)
Chae Rim as Dr. Jung Yu-jin (second sister)
Ahn Yeon-hong as Jung Yu-mi (third sister)
Park Ye-jin as Jung Yoo-sun (fourth sister)
Han Jae-suk as Dr. Lee Young-hoon (family friend)
Kim Chan-woo as Min Jun-ha (sports agent)
Ji Jin-hee as Han Tae-suk (Yu-mi's boyfriend)
Park Chul as Kim Ki-chul (widowed coach)
Nam Sung-jin as Seo Jae-yeon (Yu-mi's fiancé)

Supporting characters
Lee Jung-gil as Dr. Jung Jae-bong (sisters' father)
Kim Young-ran as Dr. Jung's wife
Kim Yong-gun as Dr. Min Yun-taek (Jun-ha's uncle)
Kim Se-joon as Han Bong-pal (Dr. Jung's younger brother)
Noh Hyun-hee as Kim Hwa-mi (nurse, Bong-pal's friend)
Lee Geun-hee as Jong-shik (Tae-suk's partner at work)
Yang Geum-seok as Kim Soon-young (Young-hoon's mother)
Kim Ji-young as Pyung Yang-daek (Young-hoon's grandmother)
Shin Ae as Yoo-sun's classmate
Sung Hyun-ah as Min Su-jin (Jun-ha's cousin and Dr. Min's daughter)
Lee Dong-wook as Lee Han-soo (American football player, Ep. 1)
 ? as Shin Dong-soo (Hae-jung's admirer)
 ? as Im Ae-ri
 ? as Supervisor Yun (Jun-ha's assistant)
 ? as Lee Shin-hee (project manager
Jang Keun Suk (Criança)

References

External links
Four Sisters official MBC website 
Four Sisters at KoreanWiz

MBC TV television dramas
2001 South Korean television series debuts
2001 South Korean television series endings
Korean-language television shows
South Korean romance television series
Television series by JS Pictures